The 1975–76 season was Clydebank's tenth season after being elected to the Scottish Football League. They competed in the newly restructured Scottish League Division Two where they finished 1st and promoted to Division One. They also competed in the Scottish League Cup and Scottish Cup and finishing runners-up in the new Spring Cup which only took place that season.

Results

Division 2

Final League table

Scottish League Cup

Group 7

Group 7 Final Table

Knockout stage

Scottish Cup

Spring Cup

Group 6

Group 6 Final Table

Knockout stage

References

 

Clydebank
Clydebank F.C. (1965) seasons